The Greater Allen Cathedral of New York is an African Methodist Episcopal church located in Jamaica, Queens, New York. The congregation currently has over 23,000 members, making it one of the largest churches in the United States. The church's budget exceeds $34 million annually and it operates a 750-student private school, as well as numerous commercial and social service enterprises. It also holds a number of expansive commercial and residential properties and coordinates a number of subsidiary organizations. It has been named one of the nation's most productive religions and urban development institutions, and is one of the Borough of Queens largest private sector employers. The church has been pastored by Floyd Flake and his wife Elaine for over three decades. Floyd Flake is also the president of Wilberforce University and a former United States Congressman.

The parent African Methodist Episcopal denomination is Methodist denomination founded by the Rev. Richard Allen in Philadelphia, Pennsylvania, in 1816. The African Methodist denomination includes other major churches such as the First A.M.E. Church of Los Angeles with over 19,000 members and the Reid Temple A.M.E. Church in Glenn Dale, Maryland with over 15,000 members.

See also
List of the largest churches in the USA

References

Methodist cathedrals in the United States
African Methodist Episcopal churches in New York City
Methodist megachurches in the United States
Megachurches in New York (state)
Churches in Queens, New York
Jamaica, Queens